Eric Michael Esquivel (born February 10, 1987) is a Latino American comic book writer and journalist, known for the 2018 series Border Town, which was cancelled following allegations that he had sexually and emotionally abused a female friend.

Early life
Eric Esquivel was born in Gurnee, Illinois, of Irish and Mexican ancestry.

Career
Esquivel has worked as a journalist and critic, writing for such websites as Bleeding Cool, Fox News Latino, Bookmans Entertainment Exchange, and The Tucson Citizen. He has worked as a comics writer for publishers including Archie Comics, Boom Studios, DC Comics, Dynamite, Frederator Books, Heavy Metal, IDW, Papercutz, Scholastic, Starburns Industries Press, and Zenescope.

In 2018, Esquivel began writing Border Town, a magic realist ongoing comics series with art by Ramon Villalobos, at the center of a relaunch of DC's Vertigo imprint. The series dealt with immigration and Latino identity, for which Esquivel received death threats in advance of its publication. The series was well-received by critics, and the first issue went to a second printing after its September 2018 release, to meet retailer demand.

In December 2018, Esquivel was accused by a woman of subjecting her to ongoing sexual and emotional abuse several years previously; he disputed her account of their interaction. His creative collaborators on Border Town (of which four issues had been published) withdrew from the project. DC cancelled the unpublished issues, and accepted retailer returns of those that had been published. DC also cancelled plans for Esquivel to take over writing their superhero Nightwing series.

In 2020, Esquivel announced Alternate Empire, a publishing venture with Eddie Berganza, who had been terminated by DC in 2017 following sexual harassment allegations.

Bibliography
Childish Delusions of Grandeur and Superiority #1-2
The Adventures of Bikini Automatic #1 (one-shot)
Calabrese! #1-2
Horrible Little People (OGN)
Reasons Why Superman is Better Than God (mini-comic)
Awesomenaut (OGN)
Zombies vs. Cheerleaders #3 (collected in Zombies vs. Cheerleaders Volume One TPB), #4, #5, #7, Volume II #2
Robot <3 Kaiju (one-shot)
Girl Scouts in Space (one-shot)
The Golden Age: Blackest Terror (mini-comic)
The Golden Age: The Owl (mini-comic)
Blackest Terror (one-shot)
Normal #1 ('zine)
Unite And Take Over: Stories Inspired By The Songs of The Smiths Volume Two (OGN Anthology)
Thor: Unkillable Thunder Christ (one-shot)
American History Z (OGN Anthology)
Electric Youth (one-shot)
Freelancers #2-6
Autobiographical-Erotic Asphyxiation (a comic strip, appearing in The Tucson Weekly)
The Legend Of Oz: The Wicked West Volume Two, #6-8
The In Crowd #1-4
The Spider's Web #3
Smell Ya Later (An ongoing comic strip, appearing in the Tucson Weekly)
Bravest Warriors #13
BOO! #3
Adventure Time #27-28
Loki: Ragnarok And Roll #1-4
Grimm Fairy Tales: Wonderland #22-25, Age Of Darkness one-shot
Grimm Fairy Tales: The Dark Queen (one-shot)
Sonic the Hedgehog #265
Mega Man #41-44
Roberto Roboto Volume One, "Domo Arigato!"
G.I. Joe - Storm Shadow: 21st Century Boy
Super Sonic Digest #11
Border Town #1-6 (issues #5-6 not published)

Further reading

Print interviews
"New/Old Heroes to Challenge 'White, Right' Status Quo". Newsarama
"Eric M. Esquivel Speaks on The Blackest Terror". Ghetto Manga
"Eric Esquivel And His Unkillable Thunder Christ". Bleeding Cool
"Atomic Interrogation: Eric M. Esquivel". Atomic Comics
"An Interview With The Unkillable Eric M. Esquivel". Comic Book Therapy
"Freelancers Are Taking Over". Broken Frontier
"Kabooooom Quickies: Eric M. Esquivel". Kabooooom
"Esquivel and Gaylord Bring on the Metal Apocalypse in “Loki: Ragnarok and Roll” for BOOM! Studios (Exclusive)". Multiversity Comics

Video interviews
"Eric M. Esquivel At PhoCo 2012". Comic Book Therapy
"A Comic Show Interview with Eric M. Esquivel - Phoenix Comic Con 2012". A Comic Show
"Invest Comics Interviews Eric Esquivel". Invest Comics
"LBCHC 2013 Eric Esquivel: Eric talks about the upcoming series, LOKI: RAGNAROK AND ROLL at Boom! Studios.". Comic Vine

Audio interviews
Steve Bryant & Digital Debates With Brion Salazar, Jeffery Simpson, Eric Esquivel, Dave Baker Word Balloon
Issue 123 – Mythology of 2 Straight Dudes in Love Comic Book Queers
 JAVILAND: Episode 21 Javiland
JAVILAND: Episode 36 Javiland
The Fred And Jeff Show: Phoenix Comicon 2013 The Fred And Jeff Show 
Ep. #010 The 'PREVIEWS' Party Podcast feat. Eric M. Esquivel & Janelle Asselin Fanboy Comics
We Be Geeks Episode 55: And Starring Eric M. Esquivel As Aquaman We Be Geeks

References

External links

Living people
1987 births
American comics writers
People from Gurnee, Illinois
21st-century American journalists
21st-century American male writers
Hispanic and Latino American journalists
Fox News people
DC Comics people
Journalists from Illinois
Writers from Illinois
American male non-fiction writers